The list of shipwrecks in September 1879 includes ships sunk, foundered, grounded, or otherwise lost during September 1879.

1 September

2 September

3 September

4 September

5 September

6 September

{{shipwreck list item
|ship=John Howard, andMorgan Richards 
|flag=
|desc=The steamships collided in the Bristol Channel off Nash Point, Glamorgan. John Howard foundered. She was on a voyage from Cardiff to Palermo, Sicily, Italy. Morgan Richards was severely damaged. She was on a voyage from Cardiff to Malta. She put back to Cardiff.
}}

7 September

8 September

9 September

10 September

11 September

12 September

13 September

14 September

16 September

17 September

18 September

19 September

20 September

21 September

22 September

23 September

24 September

25 September

26 September

27 September

28 September

29 September

30 September

Unknown date

References

Bibliography
Ingram, C. W. N., and Wheatley, P. O., (1936) Shipwrecks: New Zealand disasters 1795–1936.'' Dunedin, NZ: Dunedin Book Publishing Association.

1879-09
Maritime incidents in September 1879